The 1987–88 Memphis State Tigers men's basketball team represented Memphis State University as a member of the Metro Conference during the 1987–88 NCAA Division I men's basketball season.

The Tigers received an at-large bid to the 1988 NCAA tournament as No. 9 seed in the Midwest region. After an opening round win over No. 9 seed Baylor, the Tigers were beaten by No. 1 seed Purdue to finish with a 20–12 record (6–6 Metro).

Roster

Schedule and results

|-
!colspan=9 style=| Regular Season

|-
!colspan=9 style=| Metro Conference tournament

|-
!colspan=9 style=| NCAA tournament

Rankings

References

Memphis Tigers men's basketball seasons
1987 in sports in Tennessee
1988 in sports in Tennessee
Memphis State
Memphis State